Francisco Javier López Díaz may refer to: 
 Francisco Javier López Díaz (theologian) (born 1949), theologian and priest of Opus Dei.
 Francisco Javier López Díaz (footballer) (born 1988), Spanish footballer.